Márcio José Raposo Ramos (born 15 October 1980 in Lisbon) is a Portuguese former professional footballer who played as a goalkeeper.

External links

1980 births
Living people
Footballers from Lisbon
Portuguese footballers
Association football goalkeepers
Liga Portugal 2 players
Segunda Divisão players
Sporting CP B players
Sporting CP footballers
F.C. Vizela players
Portimonense S.C. players
Varzim S.C. players
G.D. Estoril Praia players
Gil Vicente F.C. players
F.C. Penafiel players
C.D. Mafra players
C.D. Aves players